P. Chuba Chang (29 April 1965 – 22 February 2013) was an Indian politician. He was a Member of the Legislative Assembly of Nagaland between 1998 and 2003, representing the Tuensang Sadar I constituency (until 2008 as an Independent, from 2008 onwards as a candidate of the Indian National Congress). He served as Minister of School Education in the Nagaland state government 2003-2004 and as parliamentary secretary of economy and statistics. He died at Kohima in Naga Hospital on 22,February 2013, in the midst of the election campaign in which he stood for re-election.

Chang is survived by wife Achungla Chang, a son and daughter.

References

Indian National Congress politicians from Nagaland
Naga people
Indian Baptists
1965 births
2013 deaths